The 1983/84 NTFL season was the 63rd season of the Northern Territory Football League (NTFL).

St Marys have claimed there 11th premiership title defeating the Darwin Buffaloes in the grand final by 12 points.

Grand Final

References

Northern Territory Football League seasons
NTFL